Central Siberian Yupik, (also known as Siberian Yupik, Bering Strait Yupik, Yuit, Yoit, "St. Lawrence Island Yupik", and in Russia "Chaplinski Yupik" or Yuk) is an endangered Yupik language spoken by the indigenous Siberian Yupik people along the coast of Chukotka in the Russian Far East and in the villages of Savoonga and Gambell on St. Lawrence Island. The language is part of the Eskimo-Aleut language family.

In Alaska, it is estimated that fewer than 1000 of the 1200 residents of St. Lawrence Island speak the language, while, in Russia, approximately 200 speakers remain out of an ethnic population of 1,200.

Dialects and subgroups 
Siberian Yupik has two dialects: Chaplino (Chaplinski) Yupik (Uŋazigmit) is spoken on the shores of Chukotka Autonomous Okrug in the Russian Far North, and St. Lawrence Island Yupik (Sivuqaghmiistun) is spoken on St. Lawrence Island, Alaska.

Chaplino, or Uŋazigmit, is the largest Yupik language of Siberia (the second one is Naukan Yupik), and is named after the settlement of Уӈазиӄ (Ungaziq;  or Old Chaplino in Russian). The word Ungazighmii / Уңазиӷмӣ  (plural Ungazighmiit / Уңазиӷмӣт ) means "Ungaziq inhabitant(s)". People speaking this language live in several settlements in the southeastern Chukchi Peninsula (including Novoye Chaplino, Provideniya, and Sireniki), Uelkal, Wrangel Island, and Anadyr.  The majority of Chaplino Yupik speakers live in the villages of Novoye Chaplino and Sireniki. In another terminology, these people speak Chaplino, and Ungazighmiit people speak one of its dialects, along with other dialects spoken by Avatmit, Imtugmit, Kigwagmit, which can be divided further into even smaller dialects.

The second dialect, St. Lawrence Island Yupik, is believed to be an offspring of Chaplino with only minor phonetic, phonological, morphological, syntactical and lexical differences, and the two dialects are virtually identical.

Phonology

Consonants 
Unlike the Central Alaskan Yupik languages, Siberian Yupik has a series of retroflex fricatives, more similar to the Alaskan Inuit dialects.

Vowels

Morphosyntax 
Morphosyntax is the study of grammatical categories or linguistic units that have both morphological and syntactic properties. Central Siberian Yupik’s structure most resembles this category.  In addition, CSY can be described as using both internal and external syntax. Internal syntax is used here to describe the way that postbases are added to a base or added to one another, contrasted with external syntax, which refers to the order of independent words.

Central Siberian Yupik is a polysynthetic language, meaning it is made up of long, structured words containing many separate meaningful parts (morphemes). In fact, a single word can be an entire sentence. CSY is also an ergative-absolutive language, in contrast to the nominative-accusative structure of English and many Indo-European languages.

Most Siberian Yupik words consist of a "base" or "stem", followed by zero or more "postbases", followed by one "ending", followed by zero or more "enclitics":

Generally, the “base” or “stem” contains the root meaning of the word , while the “postbases,” which are suffixing morphemes, provide additional components of the sentence (see example above).  As shown, postbases include items with adjectival and verbal qualities, among other elements. The “ending” (Woodbury’s term) is an inflectional suffix to the right of the postbase that contains grammatical information such as number, person, case, or mood. Enclitics are bound suffixes that follow the inflectional ending of a word. An attached enclitic affects the meaning of the entire sentence, not just the element to which it is attached. The exception is the enclitic ‘llu,’ shown above, which has a basic meaning of ‘and.’

Bases 

The base forms the lexical core of the word and belongs to one of three main classes: noun bases, verb bases and particle bases.
 
 Noun bases (N)
 Ordinary  noun bases (intransitive, transitive)
 Independent pronoun bases (intransitive)
 Demonstrative bases (D) (intransitive)
 Adjectival noun bases
 Inflecting as ordinary noun bases (intransitive, transitive)
 Independent relative bases
 Quantificational bases (Q)
 Numeral (NM) bases: cardinal (intransitive); ordinal (transitive)
 Specifier (SP) bases: cardinal (intransitive); partitive (transitive)
 Locational bases
 Demonstrative adverb (DA) bases (intransitive)
 Positional (PS) bases (transitive)
 Temporal bases
 Temporal noun bases (intransitive, transitive)
 Temporal particle bases
 Verb bases (V)
 Exclusively intransitive (Vi)
 Exclusively transitive (Vt)
 Ambivalent
 Particles
 Independent particles
 Sentence particles
 Phrasal participles
 Enclitics

Noun endings indicate number (singular, dual, or plural), case, and whether or not the noun is possessed. If the noun is possessed, the ending indicates the number and person of the possessor. Siberian Yupik has seven noun cases:

 absolutive
 relative (ergative-genitive)
 ablative-modalis
 localis
 terminalis
 vialis
 aequalis

Absolutive Case Noun Endings

As in other ergative-absolutive languages, absolutive case is used to mark nouns that are generally the subjects of intransitive verbs or the objects of transitive verbs.

Relative/Ergative Case Noun Endings

Ergative case identifies nouns as a subject of a transitive verb and acts as the genitive form in ergative-absolutive languages.

Ablative-Modalis Case Noun Endings

The ablative case is used to indicate the agent in passive sentences, or the instrument, manner, or place of the action described by the verb.

The endings of the locative and terminative cases are the same as those of the ablative case except that the locative case has -mi and -ni and the terminative case has -mun and -nun in place of the -meng and -neng at the end of the ablative case endings.

Prolative Case Noun Endings

In grammar, the prolative case, also called the vialis case, is a grammatical case of a noun or pronoun that expresses motion by the referent of the noun it marks.

Equative Noun Case Endings

Equative is a case that expresses the standard of comparison of equal values.

Postbases 

Derivation is accomplished in CSY by attaching suffixes called postbases. Productivity in the context of CSY is defined as the free addition of a postbase to any base without an unpredictable semantic result; non-productivity implies that said postbases cannot combine freely but are limited to attaching to only a particular set of bases. Postbases are either nominal or verbal and select nominal or verbal bases or expanded bases to attach to (an expanded base is a base followed by one or more postbases). There are four kinds of postbases:

 VN: postbases deriving nouns from verbs
 NV: postbases deriving verbs from nouns
 NN: postbases constructing complex nouns
 VV: postbases constructing complex verbs

These postbases can indicate a wide variety of meaning, including:

For nouns:

 quantification,
 adjectival modification,
 being and becoming,
 a type of verbal noun-incorporation

For verbs: 
 changes in transitivity,
 adverbial modification,
 evidentially,
 negation,
 tense,
 agent noun formation,
 relative clause formation,
 various types of verbal complementation

It is estimated that CSY has approximately 547 postbases: 75 NN, 55 NV, 30 VN, and 387 VV. It appears that in CSY the large majority of NN, NV, and VN postbases are productive; for the VV postbases, there are approximately 190 non-productive ones and 197 productive ones.

Characteristics of polysynthetic postbases

There are no clear morphological position classes in CSY. A position class is the organization of morphemes or a morpheme class into a linear ordering with no apparent connection to syntactic, semantic, or phonological representation. In the example below, it is semantic restrictions that dictate the order.

Some postbases can be used recursively, as in the example below.

Recursion can also be used for emphasis.
	

There is variability in postbase ordering with no change in semantic outcome.

Abbreviations: V, verb; PST, past tense; FRUSTR, frustrative (‘but . . ., in vain’); INFER, inferential evidential (often translatable as ‘it turns out’); INDIC, indicative; 3S3S, third-person subject acting on third-person object): (de Reuse 2006) Note: postbases noted in bold.
V:verb
FRUSTR:frustrative aspect (‘but ... in vain’)
INFER:inferential evidential (often translatable as ‘it turns out’)
3S3S:third-person subject acting on third-person object

Note: there is a general rule in CSY of semantic scope in which the rightmost postbase will have scope over the left. However, there are many exceptions, as in the example above.

Enclitics

Following are a brief list and description of enclitics in CSY. The table is recreated from de Reuse (1988).

 : modal function, interrogative 
 : modal function, optative 
 : modal function, exhortative or exclamative 
 : evidential function 
 : focus marking or conjunction  
 : can be interrogative; sometimes marks a perlocutionary act 
 : mark illocutionary acts 
 : mark the “presupposition that the hearer is unaware that the speaker lacks crucial information”  
 : shifts the attention of the hearer

Note: the ‘position’ references above refer to the position of the postbase following the main base.

Other Eskimo languages spoken in Chukotka

Other Yupik languages 

Naukan, or Nuvuqaghmiistun, the second largest Yupik language spoken in Chukotka, is spoken in settlements including Uelen, Lorino, Lavrentiya, and Provideniya.

Debated classifications 

Additionally, the Sireniki Eskimo language, locally called Uqeghllistun, was an Eskimo language once spoken in Chukotka. It had many peculiarities. Sometimes it is classified as not belonging to the Yupik branch at all, thus forming (by itself) a stand-alone third branch of the Eskimo languages (alongside Inuit and Yupik). Its peculiarities may be the result of a supposed long isolation from other Eskimo groups in the past.

Sireniki became extinct in early January 1997.

Notes

References

English 

 
 de Reuse, Willem J. (1994). Siberian Yupik Eskimo: The language and its contacts with Chukchi. Studies in indigenous languages of the Americas. Salt Lake City: University of Utah Press. .
Jacobson, Steven A. (1990). A Practical Grammar of the St.~Lawrence Island/Siberian Yupik Eskimo Language. Fairbanks: Alaska Native Language Center, University of Alaska.
Jacobson, Steven A. (1979). A Grammatical Sketch of Siberian Yupik Eskimo as spoken on St.~Lawrence Island, Alaska. Fairbanks: Alaska Native Language Center, University of Alaska.

Russian 

  The transliteration of author's name, and the rendering of title in English: 
  The transliteration of author's name, and the rendering of title in English: 
  The transliteration of author's name, and the rendering of title in English: 
 Библиография работ по языку азиатских эскимосов

Further reading

English 

 Menovshchikov, G.A.: Language of Sireniki Eskimos. Phonetics, morphology, texts and vocabulary. Academy of Sciences of the USSR, Moscow • Leningrad, 1964. Original data: Г.А. Меновщиков: Язык сиреникских эскимосов. Фонетика, очерк морфологии, тексты и словарь. Академия Наук СССР. Институт языкознания. Москва • Ленинград, 1964
 Menovshchikov, G.A.: Grammar of the language of Asian Eskimos. Vol. I. Academy of Sciences of the USSR, Moscow • Leningrad, 1962. Original data: Г.А. Меновщиков: Грамматиκа языка азиатских эскимосов. Часть первая. Академия Наук СССР. Москва • Ленинград, 1962.
 Rubcova, E. S. (1954). Materials on the Language and Folklore of the Eskimos (Vol. I, Chaplino Dialect). Moscow • Leningrad: Academy of Sciences of the USSR.  Original data: Рубцова, Е. С. (1954). Материалы по языку и фольклору эскимосов (чаплинский диалект). Москва • Ленинград: Академия Наук СССР.
 Yupik: Bibliographical guide

Russian 

 Badten, Linda Womkon, Vera Oovi Kaneshiro, Marie Oovi, and Steven A. Jacobson. A Dictionary of the St. Lawrence Island/Siberian Yupik Eskimo Language. Fairbanks: Alaska Native Language Center, College of Liberal Arts, University of Alaska, Fairbanks, 1987. 
 Bass, Willard P., Edward A. Tennant, and Sharon Pungowiyi Satre. Test of Oral Language Dominance Siberian Yupik-English. Albuquerque, N.M.: Southwest Research Associates, 1973.
 
 Jacobson, Steven A. Reading and Writing the Cyrillic System for Siberian Yupik = Atightuneqlu Iganeqlu Yupigestun Ruuseghmiit Latangitgun. Fairbanks: Alaska Native Language Center, College of Liberal Arts, University of Alaska, 1990.
  Collection of stories, originally recorded by Меновщиков among Siberian Yupik, then transliterated so that it can be read by Yupik of St. Lawrence Island.
 
 Reuse, Willem Joseph de. Siberian Yupik Eskimo The Language and Its Contacts with Chukchi. Studies in indigenous languages of the Americas. Salt Lake City: University of Utah Press, 1994. 
 Reuse, Willem Joseph de. Studies in Siberian Yupik Eskimo Morphology and Syntax. 1988.

External links 

 Endangered Languages in Northeast Siberia: Siberian Yupik and other Languages of Chukotka by Nikolai Vakhtin
  Collection of 27 texts collected by Rubtsova in 1940-1941. Translated into English and edited by Vakhtin. (The English version is the last file at the bottom of the page.) Downloadable from UAF's site licensed under Creative Commons Attribution-Noncommercial-No Derivative Works 3.0 United States License.
  Uelen language — problems of identification .
 
 

Agglutinative languages
Indigenous languages of the North American Arctic
Languages of Russia
Indigenous languages of Alaska
Yupik languages
Endangered Eskaleut languages
Siberian Yupik
Official languages of Alaska